Beeler is a surname. Notable people with the surname include:

 Jodie Beeler, American baseball player
 Joe Beeler, American illustrator, artist and sculptor
 Kathleen Beeler, American cinematographer
 Rolf Beeler, Swiss affineur
 Selby Beeler, American children's writer 
  Claire Beeler, Singer/Songwriter

See also
 Beeler, Kansas, an unincorporated community in Ness County